Arthur Wellmann (7 July 1885 – 1960) was a German painter and sculptor. His work was part of the art competitions at the 1928 Summer Olympics and the 1932 Summer Olympics.

References

External links
 

1885 births
1970 deaths
20th-century German painters
20th-century German male artists
German male painters
Olympic competitors in art competitions
Artists from Magdeburg